The 1998 Japan Series was the 49th edition of Nippon Professional Baseball's postseason championship series.  The Seibu Lions represented the Pacific League, while the Yokohama BayStars represented the Central League.  The BayStars won the series in six games, giving them their first Japan Series championship since 1960.

Background
This was a matchup of one of the most successful teams in the last two decades against one of the least successful.  The Lions were the team of the 1980s, winning eight championships from 1982 to 1992, and making five straight appearances in the championship series from 1990 until 1994.  On the other hand, the BayStars had not won the Japan Series since 1960, when the team was known as the Taiyō Whales, and had not made any appearances since.

Seibu Lions
This Seibu team was far different from the dominating teams that they enjoyed in the 1980s.  Fumiya Nishiguchi (13-12, 3.38) led the Lions pitching staff, which was also anchored in the bullpen by Denney Tomori, Shinji Mori, and Kiyoshi Toyoda.  Offensively, the Lions had Kazuo Matsui at the top of the lineup, as he batted .311 and stole 43 bases.  Rudy Pemberton and Ken Suzuki supplied the power numbers for the Lions.

Yokohama BayStars
The team's offense was known as the "Machine Gun Offense", since the BayStars led the league in batting average and were capable of rapping out hits in quick succession at practically any time.  Takanori Suzuki (.337), Bobby Rose (.325), and team captain Takuro Ishii (.314) led the team with their hitting prowess, and their teammates in the batting order all followed suit.  Pitching-wise, Yokohama was led by Takashi Saito and Daisuke Miura for starters, and Kazuhiro Sasaki was practically automatic at closer, recording 45 saves and posting a microscopic 0.64 ERA.

Summary

See also
1998 World Series

References

Japan Series
Japan Series
1998 Nippon Professional Baseball season
Yokohama BayStars
Seibu Lions